SRA-shooting is a shooting sport based on the concept of practical shooting. It originates from Finland. Its whole name is sovellettu reserviläisammunta and translates as applied reservists' shooting. Its sport style is similar to IPSC, since the objective of SRA is to develop the weapon's handling and marksmanship skills of the athlete. The weapon types used in SRA are rifle, pistol, shotgun, and sniper rifle - with emphasis on rifle and pistol.

The rules of the sport are regulated by the Finnish Reservist Sports Federation (RESUL). The International Federation SRA is the global governing body of the sport.

Whilst in IPSC shooting, it is strictly forbidden to wear any military-style clothes except in cases where the competitor is in active service. In SRA, the military clothing style and overall look is promoted. Unlike IPSC, where guns are divided in different divisions by structure and power, SRA concentrates primarily on firearms and calibers used by military or paramilitary organizations. The main emphasis is on rifles, while in contrast pistol shooting is more the focus in IPSC. 

The types of targets used in SRA resemble human-like figures (metric) while the classic target style in IPSC is a stretched octagon.

References

External links
 Reserviläisurheiluliitto, The Finnish Sports Fedearation

Handgun shooting sports